The 2015 Asian Aerobic Gymnastics Championships were the fifth edition of the Asian Aerobic Gymnastics Championships, and were held in Ho Chi Minh City, Vietnam from December 11 to December 13, 2015.

Medal summary

Medal table

References

External links
 Results

A
Asian Gymnastics Championships
2015 in Vietnamese sport
International gymnastics competitions hosted by Vietnam